Iraida Vladimirovna Vinogradova (née Matryokhina,  née Матрёхина, 10 March 1936 Chalmny-Varre, Murmansk Okrug, USSR — 31 December 2004 Russia) was a Soviet and Russian Sámi poet who wrote in both Kildin and Ter Sámi, singer of Sámi songs, a scholar of the Ter Sámi language, and a member of the Kola Sámi Association ().

Early life and education 
Iraida Vladimirovna Matryokhina was born on 10 March 1936 in the village of Chalmny-Varre, Murmansk Okrug, USSR, one of six children born into the reindeer herding family of Klavdiya Grigoryevna Matryohkina and Vladimir Mikhailovich Matryokhin. Her mother was from a Sámi family of hunters and her father was Russian, from a family of Orthodox priests from Lovozero. Her sisters Oktyabrina and Tamara are famous in their own right: Oktyabrina Voronova is also a famous Ter Sámi poet and Tamara is the linguist T. V. Matryokhina.

Vinogradova graduated from the Department of the Peoples of the North in the A. I. Herzen Leningrad State Pedagogical Institute. After graduating, she worked as a teacher in the villages of Zelenoborsky, Monchegorsk, and Olenegorsk.

Vinogradova has written poetry for children, both in Russian and in Kildin Sámi. In addition to her poetry, she was involved in creating Sámi-Russian and Russian-Sámi dictionaries.

Awards 
In 1994, Vinogradova and Elvira Galkina won the first ever Saami Council Literature Prize together but for separate Kildin Saami books that were later translated into Northern Saami and published as bilingual Kildin Saami-Northern Saami books. Vinogradova won the literature prize for the book Мун ка̄нҍц - Mu ustibat and Galkina for the book Пе̄ййвьесь пе̄ййв - Šerres beaivi.

Bibliography 
 Куруч Р. Д.; Виноградова И. В.; Яковлева Р. И. Соагкнэһкь. Саамско-русский и русско-саамский словарь для начальной саамской школы. Пособие для учащихся начальной школы. Murmansk, 1991.
 Афанасьева Н. Е.; Виноградова И. В.; Куруч Р. Д.; Мечкина Е. М.; Яковлева Р. И. Pūdz’jenč. 3 klass guėjkė lōgkėm knīga = Olešek. Kniga dlja dopolnitel’nogo čtenija v 3-em klasse saamskoj školy. Moscow-Murmansk, 1991.
 Афанасьева Н. Е.; Виноградова И. В.; Куруч Р. Д.. Правила орфографии и пунктуации саамского языка. Москва-Murmansk, 1995.
 Мун ка̄нҍц: [Парна стиха]. — Murmansk, 1991.
 Мун ка̄нҍц — Mu ustibat. — Davvi Girji, 1994.
 Чистые родники.
 Минькай.
 Без тебя с тобой. — Murmansk, 2012.
 Избранное. 2012.

References 

1936 births
2004 deaths
People from Lovozersky District
Russian poets
Sámi-language poets